The crested flounder, Lophonectes gallus, is a lefteye flounder of the genus Lophonectes, found around south eastern Australia, and New Zealand in waters less than 240 m in depth.  Their length is from 10 to 20 cm.

References
 
 Tony Ayling & Geoffrey Cox, Collins Guide to the Sea Fishes of New Zealand,  (William Collins Publishers Ltd, Auckland, New Zealand 1982) 

Bothidae
Fish described in 1880
Taxa named by Albert Günther